Avishk (also Romanized as Āvīshk and Evīshk; also known as Evick) is a village in Qohestan Rural District, Qohestan District, Darmian County, South Khorasan Province, Iran. The population was 109 at the time of the 2006 census, consisting of 30 families.

References 

Populated places in Darmian County